The Advanced Fuel Cycle Initiative (AFCI) is an extensive research and development effort of the United States Department of Energy (DOE). The mission and focus of AFCI is to enable the safe, secure, economic and sustainable expansion of nuclear energy by conducting research, development, and demonstration focused on nuclear fuel recycling and waste management to meet U.S. needs.

The program was absorbed into the GNEP project, which was renamed IFNEC.

Focus

 Continue critical fuel cycle research, development and demonstration (RD&D) activities 
 Pursue development of policy and regulatory framework to support fuel cycle closure 
 Determine and develop RD&D infrastructure needed to mature technologies 
 Establish advanced modeling and simulation program element 
 Implement a science-based RD&D program

Campaigns

The AFCI is an extensive RD&D effort to close the fuel cycle. The different areas within the AFCI are separated into campaigns. The RD&D of each campaign is completed by the United States Department of Energy's national laboratories.

 Transmutation fuels
 Fast reactor development
 Separations
 Waste forms
 Grid Appropriate Reactor Campaign
 Safeguards
 Systems analysis
 Modeling and simulation 
 Safety and regulatory

Transmutation fuels 

The mission of the Transmutation Fuels Campaign is the generation of data, methods and models for fast reactor transmutation fuels and targets qualification by performing RD&D activities on fuel fabrication and performance. The campaign is led by Idaho National Laboratory.

Reactor development 

The mission of the Reactor Campaign is to develop advanced recycling reactor technologies required for commercial deployment in a closed nuclear fuel cycle. The Reactor Campaign is led at Argonne National Laboratory.

Separations 

The mission of the Separations Campaign is to develop and demonstrate industrially deployable and economically feasible technologies for the recycling of used nuclear fuel to provide improved safety, security and optimized waste management. The campaign is led by Idaho National Laboratory. This entails alternatives to the de facto standard PUREX process, which is used by all countries that engage in large scale civilian nuclear reprocessing, but has been phased out for civilian uses in the US over nuclear proliferation concerns, with the US exerting diplomatic pressure to see it phased out globally.

Waste Forms Campaign 

The mission of the Waste Forms Campaign is to develop and demonstrate durable waste forms and processes to enable safe and cost-effective waste management as an integral part of a closed nuclear fuel cycle by establishing a fundamental understanding of behavior through closely coupled theory, experiment and modeling. This campaign is led at Argonne National Laboratory.

Grid Appropriate Reactor Campaign 

The mission of the Grid Appropriate Reactor Campaign is to enable U.S. leadership in the global expansion of nuclear energy by conducting research, development, and demonstration of technologies and innovative reactor designs that offer enhanced safety, security, and proliferation resistance and that are appropriately sized for infrastructure-limited countries.

Safeguards 

The mission of the Safeguards Campaign is to ensure that domestic fuel cycle facilities fully meet requirements under regulatory frameworks; thereby assuring that nuclear materials have not been diverted or misused. The campaign is led at Sandia National Laboratories.

Systems analysis 

The mission of the Systems Analysis Campaign is to conduct systems-wide analyses of nuclear energy development and infrastructure deployment to enable a requirements-driven process for all technical activities, and to inform strategic planning and key program decisions. The campaign is led at Idaho National Laboratory.

Modeling and simulation 

The mission of the Modeling and Simulation Campaign is to rapidly create, and deploy “science-based” verified and validated modeling and simulation capabilities essential for the design, implementation, and operation of future nuclear energy systems with the goal of improving future U.S. energy security. These AFCI activities are led at Argonne National Laboratory.

Safety and regulatory 

The mission of the Safety and Regulatory Campaign is to ensure that regulatory and licensing requirements for future facilities and technologies are appropriately considered and incorporated during the course of technology development.

References 

"Advanced Fuel Cycle Program," Idaho National Laboratory website

"Review of DOE's Nuclear Energy Research and Development Program" National Academies Press
AFCI Quarterly Report Transmutation Engineering LA-UR-06-3096
An Evaluation of the Proliferation Resistant Characteristics of Light Water Reactor Fuel with the Potential for Recycle in the United States
United States Department of Energy
Nuclear technology